The New Orleans Bowl is an NCAA-sanctioned post-season college football bowl game that has been played annually since 2001. It is normally held at Caesars Superdome in New Orleans; when the Superdome and the rest of the city suffered damage due to Hurricane Katrina in 2005, the game was temporarily moved to Cajun Field in Lafayette, Louisiana, and given the name New Orleans Bowl at Lafayette. Since 2006, the bowl has been sponsored by R+L Carriers and officially known as the R+L Carriers New Orleans Bowl. The game was previously sponsored by Wyndham Hotels & Resorts from 2002 to 2004 and was officially called the Wyndham New Orleans Bowl.

Conference tie-ins

In 2001, the Sun Belt Conference signed a temporary contract to play against the 5th-ranked team from the Mountain West Conference.  Beginning in 2002, the New Orleans Bowl established conference tie-ins with the Sun Belt and Conference USA (C-USA). The Sun Belt usually sends its conference champion to the New Orleans Bowl, but can (and has) sent the champion to what is now known as the LendingTree Bowl, such as Arkansas State playing in the 2013 GoDaddy.com Bowl. For the 2021 season, the New Orleans Bowl has first pick in the Sun Belt Conference.

In 2010, Ohio represented the Mid-American Conference (MAC) in the New Orleans Bowl, after the Bowl released UTEP to compete in the regional New Mexico Bowl. In 2011 and 2014, a Mountain West team replaced C-USA as the opponent to the Sun Belt representative.

History

In the 2001 inaugural game, Colorado State defeated North Texas, 45–20.  Starting in 2002, the Sun Belt signed a multi-year contract with Conference USA, and the two conferences began their bowl rivalry with a North Texas defeat of then-Conference USA member Cincinnati.

Due to damage by Hurricane Katrina to the Superdome, where the game is usually played, the 2005 game was played in Lafayette, Louisiana, at Cajun Field on the campus of the University of Louisiana at Lafayette, and was dubbed the New Orleans Bowl at Lafayette. The game returned to the Superdome for the 2006 edition, with a new corporate sponsor in freight company R+L Carriers, renaming the game the R+L Carriers New Orleans Bowl.  That game was won by Troy, co-champions of the Sun Belt Conference, over Rice, making their first bowl appearance since the 1961 Bluebonnet Bowl.

The 2011 through 2014 games were each won by the Louisiana–Lafayette Ragin' Cajuns by a combined score of 115–88 over four different opponents. However, the Ragin' Cajuns later had to vacate their 2011 and 2013 victories, due to major NCAA violations including ACT fraud. The Ragin' Cajuns also played in the 2016 edition of the bowl, losing to Southern Miss, and in the 2021 edition as well where they defeated Marshall.

Game results
Rankings per AP Poll prior to the game being played.

Source:

 The 2005 game was played at Cajun Field in Lafayette, Louisiana, due to damage to the Superdome by Hurricane Katrina.
 Louisiana-Lafayette vacated all 9 wins from 2011, including the New Orleans Bowl, and vacated 8 wins from 2013, including the New Orleans Bowl, due to major NCAA violations including ACT fraud.
 Louisiana–Lafayette has been known simply as Louisiana since the 2017 season.

MVPs

 MVP's team did not win the game
 MVP's team later vacated its victory

Most appearances
Updated through the December 2022 edition (22 games, 44 total appearances).

Teams with multiple appearances

 Excludes two vacated wins

Louisiana was known as Louisiana–Lafayette prior to the 2017 season.

Teams with a single appearance
Won (4): Colorado State, Florida Atlantic, Georgia Southern, Western Kentucky

Lost (10): Cincinnati, East Carolina, Marshall, Nevada, Ohio, Rice, San Diego State, South Alabama, Tulane, UAB

Appearances by conference
Updated through the December 2022 edition (22 games, 44 total appearances).

 Two vacated wins (2011 and 2013) are excluded from win–loss record.

Game records

Media coverage

Five early editions of the bowl were carried on ESPN2 (2001–2003, 2006, 2007); all other editions have been broadcast by ESPN.

References

External links
 

 
College football bowls
Recurring sporting events established in 2001